Assis Giovanaz (born 4 October 1989), known as Assis, is a Brazilian professional footballer who plays as a goalkeeper.

Club career
Born in Garibaldi, Rio Grande do Sul, Giovanaz started his youth career at América Mineiro, finishing it in Portugal at C.F. Os Belenenses. He made his professional debut with the latter on 13 February 2010, playing 11 minutes in a 1–0 away loss against S.L. Benfica in the Primeira Liga after Bruno Vale was sent off.

In 2010, Assis signed with fellow league club Vitória de Guimarães, being initially assigned to their reserves in the Segunda Liga and going on to be loaned twice. His biggest league input with the first team consisted of 16 matches, in the 2014–15 season.

On 7 July 2016, Assis joined Portuguese second division club Leixões S.C. as a free agent. He returned to the top tier the following campaign, moving to Boavista F.C. on a two-year contract.

References

External links

1989 births
Living people
Sportspeople from Rio Grande do Sul
Brazilian footballers
Association football goalkeepers
Primeira Liga players
Liga Portugal 2 players
Segunda Divisão players
C.F. Os Belenenses players
A.D. Lousada players
S.C. Freamunde players
Vitória S.C. players
Vitória S.C. B players
Leixões S.C. players
Boavista F.C. players
Brazilian expatriate footballers
Expatriate footballers in Portugal
Brazilian expatriate sportspeople in Portugal